The "Wedding of Ceyx" (Kḗykos gámos) is a fragmentary Ancient Greek hexameter poem that was attributed to Hesiod during antiquity. The poem did not only deal with the wedding of its titular protagonist, but also Heracles's actions.

Contents 
The fragments that survive imply that the subject of the poem was not simply the wedding of a certain Ceyx, but Heracles' arrival at, and involvement in, the festivities.  For this reason Merkelbach and West suppose that the poem should be regarded "as a member of that group of epics and epyllia that dealt with exploits of Heracles, like the Aspis and the Capture of Oechalia." The identity of the Ceyx whose marriage was the titular scene of the poem has been a matter of dispute. Merkelbach and West initially identified him with the ill-fated groom of the similarly ill-fated Alcyone: they were turned into birds for the hubris they showed in referring to one another as "Zeus" and "Hera". Given the poem's apparent focus upon Heracles, however, it is more likely that this Ceyx was actually the king of Trachis who was a nephew of Amphitryon, the great hero's stepfather.

The poem appears to have been popular for the witticisms and riddles uttered at the banquet. One famous riddle is preserved, although incompletely so, by a papyrus scrap and ancient quotations:

According to West, the "children" here are the flames whose mother would be wood. The "mother's mother" is the acorn, which is being roasted in the fire.

Editions and translations

Critical editions

 .
 .

Translations
 .
 .

Notes

Bibliography
 .
 .
 .
 .
 .
 .

Ancient Greek epic poems
Lost poems
Riddles
Wedding
Hesiod